The Dominic Old Scholars Association Football Club is an Australian Rules Football team currently based in Hobart, Tasmania. It is a member of the Old Scholars Football Association.

Club history
Founded

The club was founded as an old scholars team from the Dominic College in Glenorchy, Tasmania in 1976 where it commenced fielding a side in the Thirds competition before fielding a full senior side in 1978.
DOSA, nicknamed the Roosters, were a member of the Tasmanian Amateur Football League (Southern Amateurs) from 1976-1980. 
When the TAFL Old Scholars Division was formed in the Southern Amateurs in 1981 they continued on in that division until 1986 collecting premiership victories in 1984 and 1986.
In 1987 the Old Scholars clubs formed a breakaway competition known as the Old Scholars Football Association in which DOSA continues to participate in to this day.
They have six senior premierships in their thirty-two seasons of participation in the OSFA, taking home the 1987, 1994, 1995, 1999, 2013, 2018 and 2019 premierships, they have also participated in numerous losing grand finals over that duration.

Home Grounds

DOSA have had four home grounds during their years of existence.

They played their home matches at the Dominic College Football Ground in Tolosa Street, Glenorchy from 1976-2005 until they were forced to move from the venue. 
In 2006 the club began playing their matches at Cadbury's Oval (St Anne's Cricket Club Ground) in Claremont but after finding the venue to be unsuitable, they left the ground at the end of the 2009 season and began playing their home matches at North Hobart Oval where they were to set up their clubrooms and administration base in the Doug Plaister Stand.
At the end of the 2013 season DOSA was once again forced to move after AFL Tasmania decided to base the new TSL entity (Hobart City Demons) in the Plaister Stand and to give North Hobart's playing surface a rest during the wetter months and this forced the club to groundshare the TCA Ground with Hobart Football Club from 2014 onwards.

TAFL Old Scholars Division (1981-1986)  
Premiers 
● 1984, 1986

Old Scholars Football Association (1987-)  
Premiers 
● 1987, 1989, 1994, 1995, 1999, 2013, 2018, 2019.

Peter Fitzgerald Medal winners (OSFA Best & Fairest) 
● 1986 Wayne Olding 
● 1989 Tony Zeltzen 
● 1992 Wayne Olding 
● 1995 Matthew Honey 
● 1998 Matthew Honey 
● 2004 D.McConnon 
● 2012 Ben Setchell 
● 2013 Ben Setchell 
● 2016 Michael Fisher

Team of the Century

Backs 
 Rick Honey, Tom Jarvis
Half Backs 
 Paul Curtain, M.Johnston, Scott Badenach
Centres 
 Craig Scott, Matthew Honner, Paul Whitmore
Half Forwards 
 Bruce Payne, Blair Brownless, Chris Robinson
Forwards 
 Wayne Veitch, Wayne Olding, Matthew Honey
1st Ruck 
 Anthony Zeitzen, Michael Bowden, Rodney Scott
        
Interchange
 Mark Young, Kieran Dooley, Sonny Azzopardi, Todd Curtain
   
Coach 
 Wayne Olding

External links
https://web.archive.org/web/20100612220550/http://fullpointsfooty.net/dosa.htm
https://web.archive.org/web/20110710144652/http://www.dosafc.com/DOSA%20WEBSITE/

Australian rules football clubs in Tasmania
Australian rules football clubs established in 1924
1924 establishments in Australia